The Dobi-II is the second airplane designed by Lithuanian aviator Jurgis Dobkevičius in 1922. It was tested in October 1923. After two landing accidents plans for mass production of Dobi-II were abandoned.

The Dobi-II had long ailerons and were able to be folded due to an internal mechanism. This was most likely done to reduce storage, as the Dobi-II was intended for military usage. During the 1923's the Dobi-II was one of the fastest planes among the two seat aircraft with 200 hp engines. Additionally the hanging control column was used in the Dobi-II.

Specifications

References

See also

Dobi-I
Dobi-III

1920s Lithuanian military reconnaissance aircraft
High-wing aircraft
Single-engined tractor aircraft
Aircraft first flown in 1923
Conventional landing gear